Mahidol University (Mahidol), an autonomous research institution in Thailand, had its origin in the establishment of Siriraj Hospital in 1888. Mahidol had an acceptance rate for Medicine of 0.4% as of the 2016 academic year.
Becoming the University of Medical Science in 1943, it has been recognized as the country's fourth public university. The university was later renamed in 1969 by King Bhumibol Adulyadej after his father, Prince Mahidol of Songkhla, the "Father of Modern Medicine and Public Health of Thailand". The university originally focused on health sciences but expanded to other fields in recent decades. It hosted Thailand's first medical school, the Siriraj Medical School. Today, Mahidol offers a range of graduate (mostly international) and undergraduate programs from natural sciences to liberal arts with remote campuses in Kanchanaburi, Nakhon Sawan, and Amnat Charoen provinces. There are a total of 629 programs offered from 17 faculties, 6 colleges, 9 research institutions and 6 campuses. In terms of fiscal budget and portion of budget spent on research programs, the university receives the highest budget of any public university in Thailand: $430 million in 2019, most of which is granted for graduate research programs. Mahidol University was ranked Thailand's #1 university in 2011 by QS Asian University Rankings.

History

The first Siamese medical school, the Bhatayakorn School was founded under the royal decree of King Chulalongkorn in 1888 situated on the former Palace or today's Bangkok Noi campus at Siriraj Hospital and taught medicine as a 3-year medical certification course. After a visit by King Chulalongkorn and Queen Saovabha Phongsri, the medical school was renamed as the Royal Medical College. The medical school was merged with Chulalongkorn University organized by Vajiravudh's decree on 6 April 1917 as the Faculty of Medicine of Chulalongkorn University (now the Faculty of Medicine Siriraj Hospital, Mahidol University).

However, the government of General Phibunsongkhram then separated the Faculty of Medicine (Siriraj Medical School), Departments of Dentistry, Pharmacy, and Veterinary Science from Chulalongkorn University and re-organized them into the University of Medical Sciences. The university was officially founded on February 2, 1943, and new schools and departments have been established since then. In 1959, the Medical Science Preparatory School (now Faculty of Science) was moved to Phaya Thai area, thus beginning the Phaya Thai campus. During the 1960s the university focused its development on the Phaya Thai campus. In 1965, another medical school was established – the Faculty of Medicine of Ramathibodi Hospital at Phaya Thai. The first medical school outside Bangkok was also set up as Faculty of Medicine Nakorn Chiang Mai Hospital in Chiang Mai Province, until 1964 when it was transferred to Chiang Mai University. Before being transferred In 1968, the university established pharmacy and dentistry schools at a new campus apart from those received from Chulalongkorn University. On February 21, 1969, King Bhumibol Adulyadej declared the name of the university to be changed to Mahidol University in honor of his father Prince Mahidol of Songkla. The university bought a large suburban area known as Salaya in 1971 for its future developments. In the following years, the former faculties of Dentistry and Pharmacy were returned to Chulalongkorn University.

King Bhumibol expressed his will that Mahidol University should also expand to the Social Science fields, so the Faculty of Social Sciences and Humanities was founded in 1969. The construction of Salaya campus began in 1975 but was soon delayed due to the political situation and financial shortage. On July 23, 1983, the Salaya campus was officially opened. All education for freshman-year students was transferred to Salaya. Later academic developments of the university tended to deviate from traditional Health Science area to facilitate academic demands of the country and later developments were centered on the Salaya campus. The first internship college in Thailand was founded in Mahidol in 1986. In 1999, the Ratchasuda College devoted solely to disabled persons was established. Athasit Vejjajiva, M.D., father of former Prime Minister of Thailand Abhisit Vejjajiva, had once been the president of Mahidol from 1995 to 1999.

In 2002, the university expanded its campus to Kanchanaburi to offer its students more learning opportunities with rural communities as well as to Nakhon Sawan in 2004, accepting the first cohort of management students in 2004 and first cohort of arts students in 2005. The university also started building the Amnat Charoen Campus and was completed in 2009.

MU is part of the Association of Southeast Asian Institutions of Higher Learning (ASAIHL) and is also a national research university as designated by the Ministry of Education under the prime ministership of Abhisit Vejjajiva  In 2009, MU also joined the ASEAN University Network (AUN).

Ranking and Reputation

MU entered the THES - QS World University Rankings in 2006 as 322nd in the world and 3rd in Thailand. In 2010, the university proceeded to the 228th in the world, 28th in Asia and as Thailand's top-ranked university according to Quacquarelli Symonds 2010 Asian Ranking, although some foreign ranking sources may provide different rankings. According to Times magazine, MU was ranked as one of the top 400 universities in the world and first in Thailand in 2012. The following year, Mahidol placed 61st out of 100 in the first-ever Times Higher Education Asia University Rankings.

Due to the persistent focus on medical science, Mahidol has full professors appointed by the Thai monarch on academic merits and receives research grants/income from both the government and private sectors more than any other university. It has three hospitals, run independently by three different medical schools and is also affiliated with other medicare institutes. Mahidol has also produced more research papers published in international, peer-reviewed academic journals than all other Thai universities. Most of these papers have been related to medical sciences and public health.

Mahidol University International College (MUIC), the first international college in Thailand, offers a range of international undergraduate and graduate programs. Its newest division is Fine and Applied Arts which houses the Entertainment Media Program (EMP) and the Communication Design Program (CDP). EMP and CDP offer a Bachelor of Arts Degree, and EMP has 3 majors—Film, TV, or Animation.

In 2009, MU was selected to be a member of Thailand's National Research Universities by the Office of Higher Education Commission, Ministry of Education. The government has issued an emergency policy to develop the national research university to reach an international standard to promote Thailand as a central hub of Asian education, research and development. The Office of Higher Education Commission therefore organized the National Research University Initiative and Research Promotion. The cabinet has reached its resolution in May 2009 to approve the project under the budget of approximately $350 million, during the a 3-year period of 2010-2012 fiscal years.

In 2010, according to University Ranking by Academic Performance (URAP) it is the best university in Thailand and number 34 in Asia, but it has dropped to 351 in the world.

In 2018, Times Higher Education announced the World University Rankings 2019 which Mahidol was also ranked top university in Thailand. The university was ranked No. 97 on the list. In 2019, Mae Fah Luang University and Mahidol University topped Thai tertiary institutions. According to THE university ranking year 2023, the university was ranked between 801 and 1,000th on the list.

Academic Infrastructure
Mahidol is constructed of 17 faculties, 6 colleges, 9 research institutes and 6 campuses (3 provincial campuses) and offers a range of academic programs in three core academic areas; Health Sciences, Science & Technology and Social Sciences & Humanities. 
      
Over 70 centers and laboratories for specialized research fields provide new ground by using interdisciplinary and inter-institutional approach to research and postgraduate training, to meet the present and future needs of government and industry. The Mahidol University Applied and Technological Service Center provides knowledge-based services to both public and private sectors and also promotes and supports research. 
      
The university directly runs 2 Faculties of Medicine which operate 5 hospitals and 1 Institute of Medicine affiliated to 4 hospitals (with Medical Education Centers for the Collaborative Project to Increase Production of Rural Doctor) as well as providing a location to train medical students for 2 other Colleges of Medicine. In total this produces around 850 medical doctors annually and serve as centers for comprehensive specialist medical training and patient care, with a total of around 4,250 beds serving nearly 4.4 million outpatients and 120,000 in-patients per year.

The Bangkok School of Tropical Medicine, the educational arm of the Faculty of Tropical Medicine, offers regular postgraduate programs, from graduate diploma to doctoral levels. The school is acknowledged and approved by the American Society of Tropical Medicine and Hygiene to be one of the eight schools in the world in which the student can get a diploma in tropical medicine. In addition, it is the only one school in which the student can learn about tropical diseases in the actual location of the tropics. The Faculty also operates the specialist Hospital for Tropical Diseases.
  
A dental service unit at the Faculty of Dentistry and the Golden Jubilee Medical Center at Salaya serves about 340,000 patients a year. 
  
Mahidol University Library and Information Center (MULIC) contains an automated library system with cyber-linked branches in different campuses; over 1,100,000 books, theses, research reports, and bound journals; 1,200 printed journals, 15,000 electronic journals and 16,000 electronic books; 13,000 audiovisual materials; hundreds of computer terminals and multimedia viewing equipment; a full range of specialized services including online reference services, multi-database searching and document delivery services. 
  
Mahidol University Computing Network (MUC-Net) accommodates at least 500 local area networks, interconnecting more than 350 servers and 10,000 terminals/PCs in all departments throughout the university; many advanced networked computer systems inter-networked harmoniously; performing multicast and broadcast of data transmission be used within video conferences, distance learning, E-Learning, and IP-TV applications; offering sophisticated solution for Management Information System (MIS). 
  
There is an ICT Campus: MU's 'Digital Library'; the Mahidol University Library and Information Center Network (MULINET), the Mahidol University Intranet; MUC-Net; Intra-phone, IP-phone, wireless campus network; multi-media and distance learning facilities; video-conferencing facilities; Management Information System (MIS); Center for Administrative Information System (MU-ADMIN-IS).

MU also has a multi-purpose hall at the Salaya campus, completed in 2014 called Prince Mahidol Hall. It is used for the graduation ceremony as well as music performances and conferences held at Mahidol University. The building can seat 2,016 people and was designed by A49 group. It is the main concert hall for the Thailand Philharmonic Orchestra (TPO).

Academic institutions under management of Mahidol University 
 Faculties
 Faculty of Dentistry
 Faculty of Engineering
 Faculty of Environment and Resources Studies
 Faculty of Graduate Studies
 Faculty of Information and Communication Technology
 Faculty of Liberal Arts
 Faculty of Medical Technology
 Faculty of Medicine Ramathibodi Hospital
 Faculty of Medicine Siriraj Hospital
 Faculty of Nursing
 Faculty of Pharmacy
 Faculty of Physical Therapy
 Faculty of Public Health
 Faculty of Science
 Faculty of Social Sciences and Humanities
 Faculty of Tropical Medicine
 Faculty of Veterinary Sciences
 Colleges
College of Management
College of Music
College of Sports Science and Technology
College of Religious Studies
Mahidol University International College (MUIC)
Ratchasuda College
Research institutes
ASEAN Institute for Health Development
Institute of Human Rights and Peace Studies
Institute for Innovative Learning
Institute of Molecular Biosciences
Institute of Nutrition
Institute for Population and Social Research
Institute for Technology and Innovation Management
National Institute for Child and Family Development
Research Institute for Languages and Cultures of Asia

Academic institutions affiliated to Mahidol University 
Phramongkutklao College of Medicine
HRH Princess Chulabhorn College of Medical Science
 Royal Thai Army Nursing College
 Royal Thai Navy Nursing College
 Royal Thai Air Force Nursing College
Collaborative Project to Increase Production of Rural Doctor (CPIRD)
Maharat Nakhon Ratchasima Hospital Medical Education Center
Maharaj Nakhon Si Thammarat Hospital Medical Education Center
Sawanpracharak Hospital Medical Education Center
Ratchaburi Hospital Medical Education Center

Academic institutions formerly affiliated to Mahidol University 

 Faculty of Medicine Vajira Hospital, Navamindradhiraj University
 Kuakarun Faculty of Nursing, Navamindradhiraj University
 Praboromarajchanok Institute
 Boromarajonani College of Nursing
 Phrachomklao Phetchaburi College of Nursing

Locations
Located in the capital city of Bangkok, Mahidol has several campuses: one suburban campus and two older inner-city campuses in the Bangkok metropolitan area, along with a downtown high-rise office site for the College of Management, and provincial campuses in Kanchanaburi, Nakhon Sawan and Amnat Charoen provinces.

Bangkok Noi

The former lands of the Rear Palace sectioned for the establishment of Siriraj Hospital are now Bangkok Noi campus. The campus extended into the two districts of Bangkok Noi and Bangplad. This dense campus houses the Faculty of Medicine Siriraj Hospital, Faculty of Nursing, Faculty of Medical Technology, and the Faculty of Physical Therapy and Applied Movement Science. The academic setting includes personal and recreational facilities such as dormitories, cafeterias and sporting facilities.

Phaya Thai
This urban campus of  spreads over three linked compounds in central Bangkok and houses Ramathibodi Hospital and the Hospital for Tropical Diseases, with the university's traditional focus on medicine and sciences at the Faculties of Medicine Ramathibodi Hospital, Dentistry, Pharmacy, Public Health, Tropical Medicine, and Science. It also houses the Institute for Innovation and Development of Learning Process, the National Doping Control Center and the Mahidol University Computing Center, along with a range of supporting facilities and student accommodation.

Salaya

The setting is semi-rural, in Nakhon Pathom Province, within easy reach of central Bangkok. It houses the majority of academics and research departments, and a range of supporting facilities including the Central Library, branch libraries, computer labs, the Office of the President, indoor stadiums, completed sports complex, the Student Union, shops and cafeterias, student dormitories and condominiums.

Vipawadee

This downtown high-rise campus is the location of the College of Management, Mahidol University (usually abbreviated to CMMU).  This campus is the home for innovative and specialized graduate programs in management for Master's, post-Master and Ph.D. levels. CMMU has partnered with many universities around the world and have attracted many international students to this campus, which include students from Belgium, Denmark, France, Germany, Japan, Portugal and Spain. Facilities include library, computer labs, study rooms, cafeteria, shops and gym.

Samut Prakan 
Situated in Bang Phli district of Samut Prakan province is the Chakri Naruebodindra Medical Institute (CNMI), a medical institute of the Faculty of Medicine Ramathibodi Hospital, Mahidol University. The medical institute comprises the Ramathibodi Chakri Naruebodindra Hospital (a hospital with a capacity of 400 beds), a community building and ramathibodi museum, Queen Sirikit Learning and Research Centre, several student dormitories, a recreation building, and staff dormitories. CNMI was created by the faculty of medicine Ramathibodi Hospital to accomplish their "4E" goals. This includes Educational reform, Excellent living and working condition, Environmental friendly, and Energy saving.

Provincial campuses in Kanchanaburi, Nakhon Sawan and Amnat Charoen
Mahidol University Kanchanaburi Campus in western Thailand has been announced since 2002 with the main objective of expanding higher education in the upcountry region, in order to increase local incomes, create occupational opportunities and improve the quality of life of rural people. An Administration Building, 2 lecture and Laboratory Buildings, 13 dormitories and associated infrastructures have been constructed on the  space, in addition to 2 field stations for research in population studies and tropical medicine. The Faculty of Veterinary Science has opened the first hospital for livestock and wildlife of the country on this campus. Four greenhouses have been built for the Faculty of Science, Agriculture Science program. Within the next decade, MU is considering to expand the 6 offered undergraduate programs at present to become 12 programs and complete the new building facilities, including 6 additional dormitories to accommodate an expected enrolled students of 2,400.

Nakhon Sawan campus, with an administration building and a lecture, laboratory and hospital buildings, is currently offer undergraduate program in Agricultural Science, Ecocultural Entrepreneurship, Nursing Science, and Public Health. The Amnat Charoen campus was completed in 2009 and offers undergraduate program in Agricultural Science, Innovation for Social and Environmental Management, and Public Health.

See also
List of universities in Thailand

References

 This article incorporates material from the corresponding Thai article.

External links

 
Mahidol University International College

 
1943 establishments in Thailand
Education in Bangkok
Educational institutions established in 1943
Universities and colleges in Bangkok